Sami Khalil Nasser Al-Najei (born 7 February 1997) is a Saudi football player who currently plays for Al-Nassr and the Saudi national team.

Club career

Al-Nassr

2015/2016
In 2016, Al-Nassr brought Al-Najei to the first team. On 8 May 2016, Al Najei made his debut as a substitute in the 74' minute against Ittihad and scored his first goal. 5 days later he played his second match against Al-Shabab.

2016/2017
On 20 October 2016, Al-Najei played his first match of the season against Ittihad replacing Yahya Al-Shehri in the 58' minute, but he got a yellow card in the match. On 21 December 2016, Al-Najei scored his first goal of the season against Al-Fateh in 53rd minute. On 1 January 2017, he played his first match in the starting 11 against Ettifaq FC. On 14 March 2017, he got a second yellow card against Al-Raed.

International career
On 14 January 2017, Al-Najei made his debut against Cambodia in the 76th minute in a friendly, the match was ended 7-2 for the Saudis.

International goals
As of 12 October 2021.

Scores and results list Saudi Arabia's goal tally first.

Career statistics

Club
As of 30 May 2021

International

Honours

Club
Al-Nassr
Saudi Super Cup: 2020

Individual
 Saudi Professional League Young Player of the Month: April & May 2021

External links

References

1997 births
Living people
People from Jizan Province
Al Nassr FC players
Al-Qadsiah FC players
Damac FC players
Saudi Professional League players
Association football midfielders
Saudi Arabian footballers
Saudi Arabia youth international footballers
Saudi Arabia international footballers
Olympic footballers of Saudi Arabia
Footballers at the 2020 Summer Olympics
2022 FIFA World Cup players